Mbaye Badji  (born 25 February 1976) is a retired Senegalese professional footballer who played as a midfielder. He played for, among others, AS Salé in the Moroccan Botola, Sakaryaspor in the Turkish Super Lig and Al-Wadha in the UAE Pro League.

Badji was part of the Senegal national football team at the 2000 African Cup of Nations, appearing in 3 matches, including the quarter-final loss to Nigeria. Badji also appeared in two qualifying matches for the 2002 FIFA World Cup and a 2002 African Cup of Nations qualifying match.

References

External links
 Profile at TFF.org

1976 births
Living people
Senegalese footballers
Senegal international footballers
Senegalese expatriate footballers
Sakaryaspor footballers
Expatriate footballers in Turkey
Association Salé players
Senegalese expatriate sportspeople in Turkey
2000 African Cup of Nations players
Expatriate footballers in Morocco
Association football midfielders